Edma is a rural locality (a village) in Bereznitskoye Rural Settlement of Ustyansky District, Arkhangelsk Oblast, Russia. The population was 179 as of 2010. There are 5 streets.

Geography 
Edma is located on the Ustya River, 47 km northeast of Oktyabrsky (the district's administrative centre) by road. Beryozhnaya is the nearest rural locality.

References 

Rural localities in Ustyansky District